Lancs/Cheshire Division Two (usually referred to as Lancs/Cheshire 2) was a regional English Rugby Union league for teams in Cheshire, Merseyside, Lancashire and Greater Manchester at level 9 of the English rugby union system.  Teams were promoted to Lancs/Cheshire 1 and after the cancellation of Lancs/Cheshire 3 at the end of the 2019–20 season there was no relegation. 

The division was initially known as North-West West 2 when it was created in 1987, and had a number of different names with South Lancs/Cheshire 2 being the longest running.  The division switched to its final name for the 2018–19 season due to the restructuring of the northern leagues by the Rugby Football Union (RFU) as a result of 19 Lancashire clubs withdrawing from RFU competitions to form their own competitions.
Each season three teams from Lancs/Cheshire 2 were picked to take part in the RFU Junior Vase (a national competition for clubs at levels 9-12) - two clubs affiliated with the Cheshire RFU, the other with the Lancashire RFU.   

The division had a break for the 2015-16 season as the RFU decided to restructure the South Lancs/Cheshire league into three zones - Merseyside (West), Cheshire (South) and Lancashire (North).  This was short-lived and the division returned to its original format for the 2016-17 season with only Lancashire (North) remaining of the three zones.  

After the introduction of North 2 West at tier 7 for the 2019–20 season, all Lancs/Cheshire leagues dropped one level, with Lancs/Cheshire Division Two ranked at level 9.

After the cancellation of Adult Competitive Leagues (National League 1 and below) for the 2020/21 season  due to the coronavirus pandemic, the league was disbanded with teams transferred into the Lancashire Merit Table competitions, ADM Lancashire leagues or level transferred into other regional leagues.

Teams 2019–20

Teams 2018–19

Teams 2017–18

Participating clubs 2016-17
Dukinfield
Eagle
Heaton Moor
Hoylake (relegated from South Lancs/Cheshire 1)
Liverpool Collegiate
Marple
Moore
Oldershaw
Port Sunlight
Ruskin Park (prompted from Merseyside (West))
Tyldesley
Vagabonds R.U.F.C.
Winnington Park (relegated from South Lancs/Cheshire 1)

2015-16

For the 2015-16 season this league, and South Lancs/Cheshire 3, were replaced by three county-wide leagues - Cheshire (South), Merseyside (West) and Lancashire (North). However, with the exception of Lancashire North, the county leagues were axed after just one season and the South Lancs/Cheshire leagues were restored.

Participating clubs 2014-15
 Ashton-on-Mersey (relegated from South Lancs/Cheshire 1)
 Dukinfield
 Liverpool Collegiate
 Marple
 Moore
 Ormskirk
 Orrell	
 Oswestry
 Port Sunlight	
 Prenton (promoted from South Lancs/Cheshire 3)
 Southport
 Trentham (promoted from South Lancs/Cheshire 3)
 Tyldesley (relegated from South Lancs/Cheshire 1)
 Vagabonds (I.O.M.)

Participating clubs 2013-14
Bowdon (relegated from South Lancs/Cheshire 1)
Dukinfield
Liverpool Collegiate
Manchester Medics (promoted from South Lancs/Cheshire 3)
Marple	
Moore	
Ormskirk
Orrell (relegated from South Lancs/Cheshire 1)
Oswestry
Port Sunlight (promoted from South Lancs/Cheshire 3)
Ramsey (IoM) 
Southport
Vagabonds (I.O.M.)
Wallasey

Original teams
When league rugby began in 1987 this division contained the following teams:

Chester College
Hightown
Moore
Old Instonians
Port Sunlight
Ruskin Park
Sefton
South Liverpool
St. Mary's Old Boys
Vulcan
Wallasey

Lancs/Cheshire 2 honours

North-West West 2 (1987–1992)

The original incarnation of Lancs/Cheshire 2 was known as North-West West 2, and was a tier 10 league with promotion up to North-West West 1 and relegation down to North-West West 3.

Cheshire / Lancashire South (1992–1996)

Restructuring of north-west leagues saw North-West West 2 split into two new regional divisions named Cheshire and Lancashire South.  Both regional divisions were initially at tier 10 but the creation of National 5 North for the 1993–94 season meant that they both dropped to become tier 11 leagues.  Promotion was to the newly named Cheshire/Lancs South (formerly North-West West 1), while the cancellation of North-West West 3 meant that there was no relegation until further league restructuring at the end of the 1995–96 season.

South Lancs/Cheshire 2 (1996–2000)

The league system was restructured from top to bottom by the Rugby Football Union for the start of the 1996–97 season.  Firstly, as part of the reorganisation of the Cheshire and Lancashire leagues, the two regional divisions Cheshire and Lancashire were merged back into a single division called South/Lancs Cheshire 2.  The cancellation of National 5 North and creation of North West 3 meant that South Lancs/Cheshire 2 was a tier 11 league, with promotion to South/Lancs Cheshire 1 (formerly Cheshire/Lancs South) and relegation to the newly formed South Lancs/Cheshire 3 (previously North-West West 3).

South Lancs/Cheshire 2 (2000–2015)

Northern league restructuring by the RFU at the end of the 1999-2000 season saw the cancellation of North West 1, North West 2 and North West 3 (tiers 7-9).  This meant that South/Lancs Cheshire 2 became a tier 8 league.  At the end of 2014–15 season South Lancs/Cheshire 2 and South Lancs/Cheshire 3 were discontinued and all teams were transferred into Cheshire (South), Lancashire (North) or Merseyside (West).

South Lancs/Cheshire 2 (2016–2018)

After just one season Cheshire (South) and Merseyside (West) were discontinued and South Lancs/Cheshire 2 and South Lancs/Cheshire 3 reinstated for the 2016–17 seasons with all clubs transferred back into these divisions.

Lancs/Cheshire 2 (2018–present)

A further restructure for the 2018–19 season saw South Lancs/Cheshire 2 renamed to Lancs/Cheshire 2.  The cancellation of South Lancs/Cheshire 3 at the end of the 2019–20 season meant that there was no longer relegation, although promotion still continued to Lancs/Cheshire 1.  The introduction of North 2 West for the 2019–20 season saw Lancs/Cheshire drop to become a tier 9 league.

Number of league titles

Anselmians (5) 
Dukinfield (3)
Liverpool Collegiate (2)
Port Sunlight (2)
Ruskin Park (2)
Sefton (2)
Aspull (1)
Birchfield (1)
Congleton (1)
Didsbury Toc H (1)
Ellesmere Port (1)
Hoylake (1)
Manchester Medics (1)
Newton-le-Willows (1)
Old Instonians (1)
Oldershaw (1)
Orrell (1)
Sale FC (1)
Southport (1)
St. Mary's Old Boys (1)
Tyldesley (1)
Vagabonds (1)
Vulcan (1)
Wallasley (1)
Winnington Park (1)
Wirral (1)

Notes

See also
 Cheshire RFU
 Lancashire RFU
 English rugby union system
 Rugby union in England

References

Defunct rugby union leagues in England
Sports leagues established in 2017
Sports leagues disestablished in 2020
2017 establishments in England
Rugby union in Lancashire
Rugby union in Cheshire